Sheikh Mohammad Aman Hasan is a retired Major General of Bangladesh Army who served as Director General of Special Security Force. Earlier, he served as Commandant in President Guard Regiment (PGR).

Early life and education 
Hasan was born on 15 Apr 1960 in Narail, Bangladesh. He completed his SSC and HSC from Jhenaidah Cadet College. He joined Bangladesh Military Academy on 1979 and was commissioned in the Corps of Infantry. Aman is a graduate of National Defence University, China.

Career 
Hasan commanded two Infantry Battalions, two Intelligence unit and two Border Guard Battalions. He also served as Deputy President in Inter Service Selection Board (ISSB). He served under blue helmet as a Military Observer in DR Congo and as a peacekeeper in Somalia. On 10 October 2012, he joined SSF as its Director General by replacing Chowdhury Hasan Sarwardy.

Personal life 
He is happily married to Mrs Sohela Akter Shayamoli and the couple is blessed with one daughter and one son.

References 

Bangladesh Army generals
Living people
Bangladeshi generals
1960 births
People from Narail District
National Defense University (Republic of China) alumni